Two Japanese warships have borne the name Hayabusa:

 , a  launched in 1898 and stricken in 1921
 , an  launched in 1935 and sunk in 1944

Imperial Japanese Navy ship names
Japanese Navy ship names